Josephine Margaret Muntz Adams (1862 –1949) was an Australian artist who distinguished herself as a portraitist. Her portrait of Duncan Gillies, 14th Premier of the state of Victoria (1886-1890), hangs in Parliament House, Melbourne. Her portrait of the Queensland and Australian Federal politician Charles McDonald is in Parliament House, Canberra.

Her work is represented in the National Gallery of Victoria, Queensland Art Gallery, Ballarat Art Gallery, Bendigo Art Gallery and Castlemaine Art Museum.

Life 
In the gold-rich area of central Victoria, Jane Jamieson married Thomas Bingham Muntz (a council engineer, farmer and dealer in real estate) in 1861. Their first child, Josephine Margaret, was born the next year, in Barfold, near the town of Kyneton, Victoria. Nine siblings were to follow, though not all in Kyneton — e.g. her brother, Thomas Carson Muntz, was born in 1870, in the Melbourne suburb of Prahran, Victoria, where Thomas Muntz then held the position of Civil Engineer.

Josephine Muntz married Samuel Howard Adams in 1898. She was aged 36 and was already an established artist. The couple left Victoria for Brisbane, Queensland, where she continued to paint and to teach art. She also visited her brother in Alice Springs, and painted there, too.  After Samuel Adams died in 1903 in a horse and cart accident, Muntz Adams returned to her home state of Victoria until 1917 when she again lived and worked in Brisbane for five years, until 1922.

Professional success led to financial success — her work sold for high prices.  By 1911 she had purchased newly established real estate: lots 5 and 6 in Tollington Avenue in the inner city suburb of East Melbourne. These she rented out, whilst she lived in nearby lot 9, which she kept until her death in 1949.

After her death in Victoria, at the age of 87, Muntz Adams was buried with her husband in Toowong Cemetery in Brisbane.

Muntz Street in the Canberra suburb of Chisholm is named in her honour.

Career 

Muntz Adams built a successful professional career, based on expert training to develop her talent.

 1882, 1884-1889: training at the National Gallery of Victoria Art School; fellow students included Clara Southern, Jane Sutherland, May Vale and Arthur Streeton.

 1890 to 1896: study in Paris and England, with leading exponents of contemporary French and English Impressionism and portraiture:

In Paris she attended Académie Colarossi.
In England, the Herkomer Art School, where other Australian students included Kathleen O'Connor, Blamire Young and the Tasmanian Mary Augusta Walker.

In 1930 the Brisbane Courier summed up Muntz Adams' professional achievements as follows:  Described by a critic as one of the most distinguished works in the collection, a self-portrait by Mrs. Muntz-Adams, is attracting much attention at the annual exhibition of the Victorian Artists' Society. The artist had a thorough training. After studying at the National Art School, Melbourne, she worked in the studios of Julien and Delacroix, in Paris, and then joined Herkomer’s school at Bushey, Hertfordshire, England. She exhibited twice at the Old Salon, Paris, and on returning to Melbourne devoted her energies to portraiture.

Her portrait of the Hon. Duncan Gillies is in Parliament House, Melbourne; that of the Hon. Charles McDonald is in Parliament House, Canberra; one of Mr. George Watson is in the Melbourne Hunt Club; while another of Mr. J. A. Panton hangs in the City Court, Melbourne. She wanted to paint the latter attired in his everyday clothes as he appeared on the bench, but Mr. Panton preferred to be depicted in evening dress, seated in a graceful attitude, smoking a cigarette. Moore, 1930. 

In 2019, the Australian gallery owner, DJ Angeloro, rated Muntz Adams' work as "tier one":  
Tier One: professionally trained artist who earned living from their art endeavours and achieved a high level of acclaim in their day from exhibiting and have been researched to a high degree; known to have created a body of impressionist artworks and exerted an influence on the development of Impressionism through teaching or art practice example; recognized for impressionism within permanent collections.

Represented 

National Gallery Victoria:
 Girl reading, n.d., National Gallery of Victoria, viewed 23 March 2020 
 Italian girl's head, 1913, National Gallery of Victoria, viewed 23 March 2020 
 Bridge, Venice, n.d., National Gallery of Victoria, viewed 23 March 2020 
Queensland Art Gallery:
 Care, c. 1893, Brisbane Gallery

Castlemaine Art Museum 

 Untitiled landscape, c.1915

Exhibitions 

 1899:  Greater Britain Exhibition, Earl's Court, London Gold medal, awarded to Josephine M. Adams for Portrait in oil of the Hon. Duncan Gillies
 1907:  Annual exhibition, Victorian Artists Society, included George Watson, M.F.H.
 1907:  Australian Exhibition of Woman's Work, Exhibition Buildings, Carlton, Victoria. See poster by Dorothy Leviny of Castlemaine advertising the exhibition, in the collection of Museum Victoria 
 1930:  Annual Exhibition of the Victorian Artists’ Society, Self portrait
 1943:  Athenaeum Gallery (Melbourne), retrospective solo exhibition

References 

1862 births
1949 deaths
Australian women painters
19th-century Australian women artists
19th-century Australian artists
20th-century Australian women artists
20th-century Australian artists
People from Kyneton
Artists from Victoria (Australia)
National Gallery of Victoria Art School alumni
Académie Colarossi alumni